The 2012–13 Colorado State Rams men's basketball team represented Colorado State University during the 2012–13 NCAA Division I men's basketball season. The team was coached by Larry Eustachy in his 1st season. They played their home games at the Moby Arena on Colorado State University's main campus in Fort Collins, Colorado and are a member of the Mountain West Conference. They finished with a record of 26–9 overall, 11–5 in Mountain West for a second-place finish. They lost in the semifinals of the Mountain West tournament to UNLV. They receive at-large bid in the 2013 NCAA tournament which they defeated Missouri in the second round before losing to Louisville in the third round.

Departures

Recruiting

Roster

2012–13 Schedule and results 

|-
!colspan=9| Exhibition

|-
!colspan=9| Regular season

|-
!colspan=9| 2013 Mountain West Conference men's basketball tournament

|-
!colspan=9| 2013 NCAA tournament

Rankings

See also 
 2012–13 NCAA Division I men's basketball season
 2012–13 NCAA Division I men's basketball rankings

References 

Colorado State
Colorado State Rams men's basketball seasons
Colorado State
Colorado State Rams
Colorado State Rams